Sushma Singh is an Indian Administrative Service officer and the fifth Chief Information Commissioner   of India. She succeeded Deepak Sandhu and became the second woman to be appointed as the Chief Information Commissioner.

Professional career
She is a former Indian Administrative Service officer belonging to the Jharkhand cadre. She retired from Indian Administrative Service on May 31, 2009. She has served at various Secretarial positions in the Government of India namely Secretary in the Ministry of Information and Broadcasting, the Ministry of Panchayati Raj and the Ministry for the Development of the North Eastern Region (DONER). Singh became Information Commissioner on September 23, 2009 in the Central Information Commission.

References

External links

Women in Jharkhand politics
Living people
Indian Administrative Service officers
21st-century Indian women politicians
21st-century Indian politicians
Year of birth missing (living people)